Cattive ragazze (translated: Bad Girls) is a 1992 film directed by Marina Ripa Di Meana. It was produced by Alberto Tarallo and Achille Manzotti and starred Eva Grimaldi, Brando Giorgi, Burt Young and Anita Ekberg. The film was released on the Italian cinema circuit on August 15th, 1992.  Eva Grimaldi stars as a recently divorced woman falling in love with a male stripper. The production received bad publicity, as it was made using money from the country's Ministry of Cultural Heritage and Activities.

The film is considered by some to be one of the worst films ever made.  Paolo Mereghetti in his film encyclopaedia Dizionario dei Film described the film as a "vapid mess that can only serve those incapable of understanding what cinema is", and considered it able to "compete for the title of worst film in cinema history and win!" G. Giraud wrote in Il Lavoro, that Cattive ragazze "does not resemble anything in a real movie, or even recall anything previously seen at the cinema, even in its worst". Film critic Marco Giusti refers to the film as "one of the pillars of Italian trash cinema". Wired Italia placed it on its list of the 10 worst films ever made. Meana defended herself from critics, claiming that it was never her intention to create a second Battleship Potemkin.  Cattive ragazze was Di Meana's directorial debut, she never directed another film.

See also
 List of films considered the worst

References

External links
 

1992 films
1992 romantic drama films
Films set in Italy
1992 directorial debut films
Italian romantic drama films
1990s Italian-language films